Coleodactylus elizae is a species of gecko, a lizard in the family Sphaerodactylidae. The species is endemic to Brazil.

Etymology
The specific name, elizae, is in honor of Brazilian herpetologist Eliza Maria Xavier Freire.

Geographic range
C. elizae is found in northeastern Brazil in the state of Alagoas.

Habitat
The preferred habitat of C. elizae is forest, where it lives in bromeliads.

Description

References

Further reading
Correira, Larissa Lima; Gamble, Tony; Landell, Melissa Fontes; Mott, Tamí (2016). "Indels ascertain the phylogenetic position of Coleodactylus elizae Gonçalves, Torquato, Skuk & Sena, 2012 (Gekkota: Sphaerodactylidae)". Zootaxa 4084 (1): 147–150.
Gonçalves, Ubiritan; Torquato, Selma; Skuk, Gabriel; Araújo Sena, George de (2012). "A new species of Coleodactylus Parker, 1926 (Squamata: Sphaerodactylidae) from the Atlantic Forest of northeast Brazil". Zootaxa 3204: 20–30. (Coleodactylus elizae, new species).

Coleodactylus
Reptiles described in 2012